Fernando Vilar (born 15 February 1954 in Lara, Monção, Portugal) is a Uruguayan journalist and news anchor.

Born in Northern Portugal, he lives in Uruguay since his childhood. He started his journalist career in the 1980s at El Espectador. Since 1993 he is the main news anchor at Telenoche 4, a news program at Monte Carlo TV and In the mornings he speaks at De primera mano, a radio program at Radiocero FM.

References

External links

1954 births
Living people
People from Monção
Uruguayan people of Portuguese descent
Uruguayan television journalists